José Carlos do Patrocínio (October 9, 1854 – January 29, 1905) was a Brazilian writer, journalist, activist, orator and pharmacist. He was among the most well-known proponents of the abolition of slavery in Brazil, and known as "O Tigre da Abolição" (The Tiger of Abolition). He founded and occupied the 21st chair of the Brazilian Academy of Letters from 1897 until his death in 1905.

Life
José do Patrocínio was born in the city of Campos dos Goytacazes, to João Carlos Monteiro, a vicar and politician, and Justina do Espírito Santo, a young freed slave from Elmina, Ghana. João Carlos did not legally recognize his son, but he did partially subsidize his education in pharmacy school.

After finishing school, Do Patrocínio went to Rio de Janeiro, where he served as a bricklayer during the construction of the Santa Casa da Misericórdia. He became interested in Medicine and began studying at the Faculdade de Medicina da Universidade Federal do Rio de Janeiro, graduating in Pharmacy in 1874. However, Do Patrocínio could not find a home to live in after his graduation. A friend of his invited him to live in the neighborhood of São Cristóvão, where Do Patrocínio stayed at the house of a rich laird and captain named Emiliano Rosa Sena. Later entering to a Republican club, he met Quintino Bocaiuva, Lopes Trovão and Pardal Mallet, among others.

He soon fell in love with Sena's daughter, Maria Henriqueta, whom he affectionately called "Bibi". Although Emiliano initially disapproved their relationship, he later complied with it. With Sena's permission, Do Patrocínio married Bibi in 1879.

During this period, Do Patrocínio began his journalistic career. He founded, alongside Demerval da Fonseca, a journal named Os Ferrões (The Stings). Fonseca used the pen name "Eurus Ferrão", while Do Patrocínio used "Notus Ferrão". In 1879, he became a contributing editor for the journal Gazeta de Notícias, where he wrote articles under the pen name "Prudhomme". Within a short time his abolitionist writings increased the daily circulation of the paper from 2,000 to 12,000 copies. In 1880 he founded an Abolitionist society, called the Confederação Abolicionista (Abolitionist Confederation), alongside Joaquim Nabuco. He and its members (such as André Rebouças and Aristides Lobo) were famous for buying manumissions for slaves.

In 1885, invited by Francisco de Paula Ney, he travelled to Ceará, where he was very well received. He was also well received when returned to Campos dos Goytacazes, where he took his mother to Rio de Janeiro, for her burial. Famous personalities, such as Ruy Barbosa, Rodolfo Epifânio de Sousa Dantas, Campos Sales and Prudente de Morais, attended the burial. Patrocínio had been a staunch republican for years, but in 1888 he abruptly converted into a supporter of the Brazilian monarchy out of gratitude towards Princess Isabel when she decided to defy the slave-owning aristocracy and declared the abolition of slavery on May 13. When he heard the news that slavery had suddenly been revoked in the country, his immediate reaction was to break into the Imperial Senate floor running and throw himself in tears before the Princess' desk and kiss her hands. In the following months he dissociated himself from his republican club and founded the Black Guard to protect the monarchy against the rebellious aristocracy and military. In late 1889, however, with the Brazilian Proclamation of the Republic, the Black Guard was dissolved. Patrocínio became a supporter of the Navy Revolt (Revolta da Armada) of 1893 against the newly founded Republic. As a result of his participation in the revolt he was briefly exiled in Cucuí, in Amazonas.

Do Patrocínio remained an active journalist after his exile up to his death in 1905. He died during a speech in honor of Alberto Santos-Dumont at the Teatro Lírico in Rio de Janeiro, due to hemoptysis. His funeral procession was attended by approximately 10,000 people.

Works
 Mota Coqueiro, ou A Pena de Morte (1877)
 Os Retirantes (1879)
 Pedro Espanhol (1884)

Representations in popular culture
Do Patrocínio was portrayed by Antonio Pitanga in the 1969 telenovel Sangue do Meu Sangue, by Kadu Karneiro in its 1995 remake, by Valter Santos in the 1988 miniseries Abolição and by Maurício Gonçalves in the 1999 miniseries Chiquinha Gonzaga.

References

External links
 Do Patrocínio's biography at the official site of the Brazilian Academy of Letters 

1854 births
1905 deaths
Brazilian journalists
Brazilian abolitionists
People from Campos dos Goytacazes
Members of the Brazilian Academy of Letters
Brazilian people of Portuguese descent
Brazilian people of African descent